Parag Satish Shrivas (born 9 June 1997) is an Indian professional footballer, who plays as a defender for Bengaluru in the Indian Super League.

Career
Born in Maharashtra, Shrivas was motivated to play football from the age of seven. In July 2013, Shrivas was selected to represent India after winning the zonal competition of the Bajaj Allianz Junior Football Camp. He was selected among over 3,000 players.

On 13 October 2017, it was announced that Shrivas would join the inaugural squad for Bengaluru B, the reserve side of Indian Super League club, Bengaluru. Later, on 27 February 2019, Shrivas was called up to Bengaluru's first team for their league match against Jamshedpur. He came on to make his professional debut in the 57th minute as Bengaluru lost 5–1. At the end of the season, Shrivas was named the Bengaluru B Player of the Season.

Career statistics

Club

Honours

Bengaluru
 Durand Cup: 2022

References

1997 births
Living people
People from Amravati
Indian footballers
Bengaluru FC players
Association football forwards
Footballers from Maharashtra
I-League 2nd Division players
Indian Super League players